Ito may refer to:

Places
 Ito Island, an island of Milne Bay Province, Papua New Guinea
 Ito Airport, an airport in the Democratic Republic of the Congo
 Ito District, Wakayama, a district located in Wakayama Prefecture, Japan
 Itō, Shizuoka

People
 Itō (surname), for people with the Japanese surname Itō
 , Japanese voice actor
 Princess Ito (died 861), Japanese imperial princess
 Ito Giani (1941–2018), Italian sprinter
 Ito (footballer, born 1975), full name Antonio Álvarez Pérez, Spanish footballer
 Ito (footballer, born 1992), full name Jorge Delgado Fidalgo, Spanish footballer
 Ito (footballer, born 1994), full name Mario Manuel de Oliveira, Angolan footballer
 , Japanese fashion model and actress (born 1995), Japanese fashion model and actress
Ito Smith (born 1995), American football player
 Ito Curata (1959–2020), Filipino fashion designer
 Ito Morabito (born 1977), French designer
 Ito Ogawa (born 1973), Japanese novelist, lyricist, and translator

Other uses
 Ito language
 Indium tin oxide (ITO), a transparent thin film conductor
 Ito1, an abbreviation of cardiac transient outward potassium current
 Ito: A Diary of an Urban Priest, a 2010 documentary film by Pirjo Honkasalo

See also
 Ito cell, a fat-storing cell found in the liver; also called a hepatic stellate cell
 Ito-toren, an office building in Amsterdam
 Itô calculus
 in Spanish, diminitives are formed by appending -ito to masculine words
 Itō (disambiguation)
 ITO (disambiguation)

Japanese-language surnames